Sarah J. Kendzior (born September 1, 1978) is an American author, anthropologist, researcher, and scholar. Kendzior is the author of The View from Flyover Country – a collection of essays first published by Al Jazeera – and is co-host of the Gaslit Nation podcast. In 2020, she published her second book, Hiding in Plain Sight: The Invention of Donald Trump and the Erosion of America, which was a New York Times bestseller. In September 2022, she published her third book, They Knew: How a Culture of Conspiracy Keeps America Complacent.

Early life and education
Kendzior was born in New Haven, Connecticut. She was raised in Meriden, Connecticut.

In 2000, Kendzior received a B.A. in history from Sarah Lawrence College and, in 2006, she received an M.A. in Eurasian Studies from the Department of Central Eurasian Studies at Indiana University. Her thesis was State Propaganda on Islam in Independent Uzbekistan. In 2012, Kendzior earned a PhD in anthropology from Washington University in St. Louis. Her dissertation was The Uzbek Opposition in Exile: Diaspora and Dissident Politics in the Digital Age, and her advisor was John Bowen. Her focus of study was former Soviet Union totalitarian states. Kendzior's dissertation was on how dissidents from Uzbekistan used the internet to challenge an authoritarian government in a climate of surveillance and distrust.

Career
From 2000 to 2003, Kendzior worked as an online news editor and writer for the New York Daily News. From 2012 to 2014, Kendzior was a columnist for Al Jazeera,. From 2016 to 2020, Kendzior was a columnist for The Globe and Mail. She has also written for The Guardian, Foreign Policy, Marie Claire, and other outlets. Some of Kendzior's journalism has focused locally on St. Louis.

Kendzior has frequently appeared on MSNBC on the AM Joy show hosted by Joy Reid.

Kendzior and Bill Kristol were the main speakers for the 7th annual Public Values Symposium held on March 29, 2019, at the University of Missouri–Saint Louis. The two speakers saw "eye-to-eye... on the importance of people speaking up for what they believe in the face of eroding societal norms." They disagreed on the role of American institutions, which Kendzior described as corrupt and unable to stave off authoritarianism, with Kendzior noting, “Belief in American exceptionalism is what got us here.” 

Kendzior was a featured speaker for the Canadian Journalism Foundation's annual Ottawa J-Talk on April 9, 2019.

Regarding her coverage of Donald Trump, Kendzior has stated that she has had "three advantages":

Arthur Levitt interviewed Kendzior about her book and career in a May 2019 podcast for Bloomberg News.

The Columbia Journalism Review reported that because of her writings and expertise on authoritarian states, "as the new president came into power and the specter of Russian interference in his victory triggered Mueller's investigation, the limos started lining up" to drive Kendzior to interviews at television studios because her insights are valuable to the public.

The View from Flyover Country
In 2015, Kendzior self-published her first book as an ebook – a collection of essays on the American condition first published by Al Jazeera starting in 2013 – called The View from Flyover Country.

In June 2017, speaking to an American Library Association conference, Hillary Clinton described herself as "riveted by... The View From Flyover Country, which turned out to be especially relevant in the midst of our current health-care debate."

In April 2018, Flatiron Books published an updated print version of Kendzior's The View . The New York Post described it as a "collection of essays from the talented Kendzior, who writes intelligently and with great empathy about problems faced by the Midwest." The Buffalo News described Kendzior's The View as "an astonishment and a challenge to convention for all sorts of reasons," and described Kendzior as having "roared to the fore" because of her prediction of the 2016 election results, a result of having studied foreign demagogues and understanding deteriorating conditions in the U.S.

The book was listed as a New York Times bestseller in May 2018.

Gaslit Nation podcast
Together with Andrea Chalupa, Kendzior hosts a podcast, Gaslit Nation, which originated as part of Dame magazine. In Psychology Today, Joe Pierre stated that the podcast "frequently reminds listeners that the Trump administration is part of a 'transnational crime syndicate masquerading as a government'", stating that

Incidents during the Trump administration

In 2016, Kendzior wrote about similarities between Donald Trump and the authoritarian leaders she had studied given Trump's admiration for Russian president Vladimir Putin before there was widespread public awareness of Russia's interference in the US election.

Personal life
Kendzior lives in St. Louis, Missouri, and is married with children.

Selected works and publications

Books

Selected publications

References

External links
 
 Gaslit Nation weekly podcast by Sarah Kendzior and Andrea Chalupa
 
 
 

Place of birth missing (living people)
Living people
Missouri Independents
MSNBC people
American women television journalists
People from Meriden, Connecticut
Journalists from Connecticut
Journalists from Missouri
Left-wing populism in the United States
Liberalism in the United States
Sarah Lawrence College alumni
Indiana University alumni
Washington University in St. Louis alumni
21st-century American journalists
21st-century American women writers
1978 births